Sunkoshi may refer to:

River
Sun Koshi, a tributary of the Koshi river in Eastern Nepal

Rural municipalities
Sunkoshi, Okhaldhunga, a rural municipality in Okhaldhunga District, Nepal
Sunkoshi, Sindhupalchok a rural municipality in Sindhupalchok District, Nepal
Sunkoshi, Sindhuli a rural municipality in Sindhuli District, Nepal

Other
Sunkoshi Small Hydropower Plant, a hydropower plant in Nepal